A Scandinavian mile (Norwegian and , [], like "meal") is a unit of length common in Norway, Finland and Sweden, but not Denmark. Today, it is standardised as 1  being , but it had different values in the past.

The word is derived from the same Roman source as the English mile. In Norway and Sweden, the international mile is formally called "English mile", although it is generally just referred to by the English word mile. However, in situations where confusion may arise it is more common for Scandinavians to describe distances in terms of the official SI unit kilometre.

This modern definition of 10 kilometres (km) is equivalent to the obsolete myriametre, which was once used in France.

History

The metric system was introduced in Norway in 1875 and Sweden in 1889, after a decision by the parliament in 1876 and a ten-year transition period from 1879.

In 1887 the metric system was introduced to Finland. The traditional Finnish , called  in Swedish (that defined the same length), was then redefined to be exactly . In Finland, however, it has been much less in use than in Sweden.

Usage
The  is currently not used on road signs, and kilometre is the standard for most formal written distances. However, it is very common in colloquial speech, including 5 km, which is referred to in Swedish as "half a ". The  has however not lost all formal uses. It is also used in the most common unit for measuring vehicle fuel consumption – "litres per " – and in second-hand car advertisements, where odometer readings are often quoted in  though the car itself records kilometres.

In literature
Naomi Mitchison, in her autobiographic book You May Well Ask, relates an experience during a walking tour in Sweden: "Over in Gotland I walked again, further than I would have if I had realized that the milestones were in old Swedish miles, so that my disappointing three-mile walk along the cold sea edge under the strange ancient fortifications was really fifteen English miles".

See also
 Danish units of measurement

References

Units of length
Science and technology in Norway
Science and technology in Sweden
Decimalisation
1889 introductions